Anti-Romani sentiment (also called antigypsyism, anti-Romanyism, Romaphobia, or Antiziganism) is a form of bigotry which consists of hostility, prejudice, discrimination, racism and xenophobia which is specifically directed at Romani people (Roma, Sinti, Iberian Kale, Welsh Kale, Finnish Kale, Horahane Roma, and Romanichal). Non-Romani itinerant groups in Europe such as the Yenish, Irish and Highland Travellers are frequently given the name "gypsy" and as a result, they are frequently confused with the Romani people. As a result, sentiments which were originally directed at the Romani people are also directed at other traveler groups and they are frequently referred to as "antigypsy" sentiments.

The term Antigypsyism is recognized by the European Parliament and the European Commission as well as by a wide cross-section of civil society.

Etymology

In the Romani language, Rom is a masculine noun, meaning 'man of the Roma ethnic group' or 'man, husband', with the plural Roma. However, in most cases, in other languages Rom is currently used as a descriptive term for people of all genders.

History

In the Middle Ages

In the early 13th-century Byzantine records, the Atsínganoi are mentioned as "wizards ... who are satanically inspired and pretend to predict the unknown".

The enslavement of the Roma, mostly taken as prisoners of war, in the Danubian Principalities is first documented in the late 15th century. In these countries, extensive legislation that divided the Roma into different groups, according to their tasks as slaves, was passed.

By the 16th century, many Romani who lived in Eastern and Central Europe worked as musicians, metal craftsmen, and soldiers. As the Ottoman Empire expanded, it relegated the Romani, who were seen as having "no visible permanent professional affiliation", to the lowest rung of the social ladder.

The Dacianos

The Dacianos formed the mythical group of European wanderers, said to be a caste of the Romani. They purportedly specialised in child-stealing and the manufacture of human freaks. They are also referred to as a criminal society that lasted until the 18th century, maiming children so they could be sold as professional beggars. The Dacianos are cited to have inhabited parts of Spain for several hundred years. The term itself used to be, along with gitanos, a Spanish name for Roma. They were also identified as the Comprachicos or Comprapequeños (meaning "boy-buyers") in Victor Hugo's The Man Who Laughs. Hugo claimed that traces of this group can be found in the penal laws passed by Spanish and English governments. The origin of their name is allegedly linked to the ancient region of Dacia, a former kingdom and posteriorly a Roman province.

16th and 17th centuries
In Royal Hungary in the 16th century at the time of the Turkish occupation, the Crown developed strong anti-Romani policies, since these people were considered suspect as possible Turkish spies or as a fifth column. In this atmosphere, they were expelled from many locations and increasingly adopted a nomadic way of life.

The first anti-Romani legislation was issued in the March of Moravia in 1538, and three years later, Ferdinand I ordered that Romani in his realm be expelled after a series of fires in Prague.

In 1545, the Diet of Augsburg declared that "whosoever kills a Gypsy (Romani), will be guilty of no murder". The subsequent massive killing spree which took place across the empire later prompted the government to step in to "forbid the drowning of Romani women and children".

In England, the Egyptians Act 1530 passed by the Crown in Parliament banned Romani from entering the country and required those living in the country to leave within 16 days. Failure to do so could result in confiscation of property, imprisonment and deportation. The act was amended with the Egyptians Act 1554, which directed that they abandon their "naughty, idle and ungodly life and company" and adopt a settled lifestyle. For those who failed to adhere to a sedentary existence, the Privy council interpreted the act to permit the execution of non-complying Romani "as a warning to others".

In 1660, the Romani were prohibited from residing in France by King Louis XIV.

18th century

In 1710, Joseph I, Holy Roman Emperor, issued an edict against the Romani, ordering "that all adult males were to be hanged without trial, whereas women and young males were to be flogged and banished forever." In addition, in the kingdom of Bohemia, Romani men were to have their right ears cut off; in the March of Moravia, the left ear was to be cut off. In other parts of Austria, they would be branded on the back with a branding iron, representing the gallows. These mutilations enabled authorities to identify the individuals as Romani on their second arrest. The edict encouraged local officials to hunt down Romani in their areas by levying a fine of 100 Reichsthaler on those who failed to do so. Anyone who helped Romani was to be punished by doing forced labor for half a year. The result was mass killings of Romani across the Holy Roman empire. In 1721, Charles VI amended the decree to include the execution of adult female Romani, while children were "to be put in hospitals for education".

The Great Gypsy Round-up, also known as the "general imprisonment of the gypsies" (prisión general de gitanos), was a raid authorized and organized by the Spanish Monarchy in 1749, that led to the arrest of most gypsies (Romani) in the region. Although a majority were released after a few months, many others spent several years imprisoned and subject to forced labor. The raid was approved by the King Ferdinand VI of Spain. .

In 1774, Maria Theresa of Austria issued an edict forbidding marriages between Romani. When a Romani woman married a non-Romani, she had to produce proof of "industrious household service and familiarity with Catholic tenets", a male Rom "had to prove his ability to support a wife and children", and "Gypsy children over the age of five were to be taken away and brought up in non-Romani families."

In 2007 the Romanian government established a panel to study the 18th- and 19th-century period of Romani slavery by Princes, local landowners, and monasteries. This officially legalized practice was first documented in the 15th century. Slavery of Romani was outlawed in the Romanian Principalities of Moldavia and Wallachia in around 1856.

19th century
Governments regularly cited petty theft committed by Romani as justification for regulating and persecuting them. It did not officially close down until 1970. The results were published in 1905 in Dillmann's Zigeuner-Buch, which was used in the following years as justification for the Porajmos. It described the Romani people as a "plague" and a "menace", but almost exclusively characterized "Gypsy crime" as trespassing and the theft of food.

In the United States during Congressional debate in 1866 over the Fourteenth Amendment to the United States Constitution which would subsequently grant citizenship to all persons born within U.S. territory, an objection raised was that a consequence of enacting the amendment would be to grant citizenship to Roma and other groups perceived by some as undesirable.

Pennsylvania Senator Edgar Cowan stated, 

In response Senator John Conness of California observed,

Porajmos

The persecution of the Romani people reached a peak during World War II, in the Porajmos (literally, the devouring), a descriptive neologism for the Nazi genocide of Romanis during the Holocaust. The Romani communities in Central and Eastern Europe were less organized than the Jewish communities were; and as a result, the Einsatzgruppen, the mobile killing squads which travelled from village to village and massacred their Romani inhabitants where they lived, typically left few to no records of the number of Roma who they killed in this way. Even though a significant amount of documentary evidence of mass murder was produced in a few cases, it is more difficult to assess the actual number of victims. Historians estimate that between 220,000 and 500,000 Romani were killed by the Germans and their collaborators—25% to over 50% of the slightly fewer than 1 million Roma who lived in Europe at that time. More thorough research by Ian Hancock revealed the death toll to be at about 1.5 million.

Nazi racial ideology put Romani, Jewish, Slavic and Black people at the bottom of the racial scale. The German Nuremberg Laws of 1935 stripped Jews of citizenship, confiscated property and criminalized sexual relationships and marriage with Aryans. These laws were extended to Romani as Nazi policy towards Roma and Sinti was complicated by pseudo-historic racialist theories, which could be contradictory, namely that the Romani were of Egyptian ancestry. While they considered Romani grossly inferior, they believed the Roma people had some distant "Aryan" roots that had been corrupted. The Romani are actually a distinctly European people of considerable Northwestern Indian descent, or what is literally considered to be Aryan. Similarly to European Jews, specifically the Ashkenazi, the Romani people quickly acquired European genes via enslavement and intermarriage upon their arrival in Europe 1,000 years ago.

In the Protectorate of Bohemia and Moravia, the Nazi genocide of the Romani was so thorough that it exterminated the majority of Bohemian Romani speakers, eventually leading to the language's extinction in 1970 with the death of its last known speaker, Hana Šebková. In Denmark, Greece and a small number of other countries, resistance by the native population thwarted planned Nazi deportations and extermination of the Romani. In most conquered countries (e.g., the Baltic states), local cooperation with the Nazis expedited the murder of almost all local Romani. In Croatia, the Croatian collaborators of the Ustaše were so vicious only a minor remnant of Croatian Romani (and Jews) survived the killings.

In 1982, West Germany formally recognized that genocide had been committed against the Romani. Before this they had often claimed that, unlike Jews, Roma and Sinti were not targeted for racial reasons, but for "criminal" reasons, invoking antiziganist stereotype. In modern Holocaust scholarship the Porajmos has been increasingly recognized as a genocide committed simultaneously with the Shoah.

Catholic Church takes responsibility
On 12 March 2000, Pope John Paul II issued a formal public apology to, among other groups of people affected by Catholic persecution, the Romani people and begged God for forgiveness. On 2 June 2019, Pope Francis acknowledged during a meeting with members of the Romanian Romani community the Catholic Church's history of promoting "discrimination, segregation and mistreatment" against Romani people throughout the world, apologized, and asked the Romani people for forgiveness.

Contemporary antiziganism
A 2011 report issued by Amnesty International states, "systematic discrimination is taking place against up to 10 million Roma across Europe. The organization has documented the failures of governments across the continent to live up to their obligations."

Antiziganism has continued well into the 2000s, particularly in Slovakia, Hungary, Slovenia and Kosovo. In Bulgaria, Professor Ognian Saparev has written articles stating that 'Gypsies' are culturally inclined towards theft and use their minority status to 'blackmail' the majority. European Union officials censured both the Czech Republic and Slovakia in 2007 for forcibly segregating Romani children from regular schools.

The Council of Europe Commissioner for Human Rights, Thomas Hammarberg, has been an outspoken critic of antiziganism. In August 2008, Hammarberg noted that "today's rhetoric against the Roma is very similar to the one used by Nazi Germany before World War II. Once more, it is argued that the Roma are a threat to safety and public health. No distinction is made between a few criminals and the overwhelming majority of the Roma population. This is shameful and dangerous".

According to the latest Human Rights First Hate Crime Survey, Romanis routinely suffer assaults in city streets and other public places as they travel to and from homes and markets. In a number of serious cases of violence against them, attackers have also sought out whole families in their homes or whole communities in settlements predominantly housing Romanis. The widespread patterns of violence are sometimes directed both at causing immediate harm to Romanis, without distinction between adults, the elderly, and small children and physically eradicating the presence of Romani people in towns and cities in several European countries.

Public opinion 
The extent of negative attitudes towards Romani people varies across different parts of Europe.

European Union

The practice of placing Romani students in segregated schools or classes remains widespread in countries across Europe. Many Romani children have been channeled into all-Romani schools that offer inferior quality education and are sometimes in poor physical condition or into segregated all-Romani or predominantly Romani classes within mixed schools. Many Romani children are sent to classes for pupils with learning disabilities. They are also sent to so-called "delinquent schools", with a variety of human rights abuses.

Romani in European cities are often accused of crimes such as pickpocketing. In 2009, a documentary by the BBC called Gypsy Child Thieves showed Romani children being kidnapped and abused by Romani gangs from Romania. The children were often held locked in sheds during the nights and sent to steal during the days. However, Chachipe, a charity which works for the human rights of Romani people, has claimed that this programme promoted "popular stereotypes against Roma which contribute to their marginalisation and provide legitimacy to racist attacks against them" and that in suggesting that begging and child exploitation was "intrinsic to the Romany culture", the programme was "highly damaging" for the Romani people. However, the charity accepted that some of the incidents that were detailed in the programme in fact took place.

The documentary speculated that in Milan, Italy a single Romani child was able to steal as much as €12,000 in a month; and that there were as many as 50 of such abused Romani children operating in the city. The film went on to describe the link between poverty, discrimination, crime and exploitation.

A United Nations study found that Romani people living in European countries are arrested for robbery much more often than other groups. Amnesty International and Romani rights groups such as the Union Romani blame widespread institutionalised racism and persecution. In July 2008, a Business Week feature found the region's Romani population to be a "missed economic opportunity". Hundreds of people from Ostravice, in the Beskydy mountains in the Czech Republic, signed a petition against a plan to move Romani families from Ostrava city to their home town, fearing the Romani as well as claiming their schools would not being able to cope with the influx of Romani children.

In 2009, the UN's anti-racism panel charged that "Gypsies suffer widespread racism in European Union". The EU has launched a program entitled Decade of Roma Inclusion to combat this and other problems.

Austria
On 5 February 1995, Franz Fuchs killed four Romani in Oberwart with a pipe bomb improvised explosive device which was attached to a sign that read "Roma zurück nach Indien" ("Romani back to India"). It was the worst racial terror attack in post-war Austria, and was Fuchs's first fatal attack.

Bulgaria

In 2011 in Bulgaria, the widespread anti-Romanyism culminated in anti-Roma protests in response to the murder of Angel Petrov on the orders of Kiril Rashkov, a Roma leader in the village of Katunitsa. In the subsequent trial, the killer, Simeon Yosifov, was sentenced to 17 years in jail. As of May 2012, an appeal was under way.

Protests continued on 1 October in Sofia, with 2000 Bulgarians marching against the Romani and what they viewed to be the "impunity and the corruption" of the political elite in the country.

Volen Siderov, leader of the far-right Ataka party and presidential candidate, spoke to a crowd at the Presidential Palace in Sofia, calling for the death penalty to be reinstated as well as Romani ghettos to be dismantled.

Many of the organized protests were accompanied by ethnic clashes and racist violence against Romani. The protesters shouted racist slogans like "Gypsies into soap" and "Slaughter the Turks!" Many protesters were arrested for public order offenses. The news media labelled the protests as anti-Romani Pogroms.

Furthermore, in 2009, Bulgarian prime minister Boyko Borisov referred to Roma as "bad human material". The vice-president of the Party of European Socialists, Jan Marinus Wiersma claimed that he "has already crossed the invisible line between right-wing populism and extremism".

In 2019 pogroms against the Roma community in Gabrovo broke out after three young Romani were accused of assaulting a local shopkeeper. The following wave of riots saw incidents of violence and arson of two houses where Roma people were living, leading to the majority of the towns Roma community fleeing over night leaving behind their homes to be looted. Roma rights NGO said that gendarmerie were deployed near places where there were Roma houses, but the police had “shown frustration, urging more Gabrovo Roma to spend the next few days with relatives in other municipalities”. Many Roma have never returned as their homes were burned down and their property destroyed.

Czech Republic

Roma make up 2–3% of population in the Czech Republic. According to Říčan (1998), Roma make up more than 60% of Czech prisoners and about 20–30% earn their livelihood in illegal ways, such as procuring prostitution, trafficking and other property crimes. Roma are thus more than 20 times overrepresented in Czech prisons than their population share would suggest.

Several Roma walls have been built by local authorities to segregate the Roma minority from the rest of the population. Such practices have been criticised by both human rights organizations and the European Union, who see it as a case of racial segregation. EU Commissioner Guenter Verheugen called instanced of Roma walls being erected in the Czech Republic "a violation of human rights". The Czech government provided local authorities money for social welfare programmes for Romani, but much of the money was used for buying the houses of the non-Roma residents, thus creating a local Roma-only "ghetto".

According to 2010 survey, 83% of Czechs consider Roma asocial and 45% of Czechs would like to expel them from the Czech Republic. A 2011 poll, which followed after a number of brutal attacks by Romani perpetrators against majority population victims, revealed that 44% of Czechs are afraid of Roma people. The majority of the Czech people that have a personal experience with Romani people, do not want to have Romanis as neighbours (almost 90%, more than any other group) seeing them as thieves and social parasites. In spite of long waiting time for a child adoption, Romani children from orphanages are almost never adopted by Czech couples. After the Velvet Revolution in 1989 the jobs traditionally employing Romanis either disappeared or were taken over by immigrant workers.

In January 2010, Amnesty International launched a report titled Injustice Renamed: Discrimination in Education of Roma persists in the Czech Republic. According to the BBC, it was Amnesty's view that while cosmetic changes had been introduced by the authorities, little genuine improvement in addressing discrimination against Romani children has occurred over recent years.

The 2019 Pew Research poll found that 66% of Czechs held unfavorable views of Roma.

Denmark
In Denmark, there was much controversy when the city of Helsingør decided to put all Romani students in special classes in its public schools. The classes were later abandoned after it was determined that they were discriminatory, and the Romanis were put back in regular classes.

France

France has come under criticism for its treatment of Roma. In the summer of 2010, French authorities demolished at least 51 illegal Roma camps and began the process of repatriating their residents to their countries of origin. The French government has been accused of perpetrating these actions to pursue its political agenda.  In July 2013, Jean-Marie Le Pen, a very controversial far-right politician and founder of the National Front party, had a lawsuit filed against him by the European Roma and Travellers Forum, SOS Racisme and the French Union of Travellers Association after he publicly called France's Roma population "smelly" and "rash-inducing", claiming his comments violated French law on inciting racial hatred.

Germany
After 2005 Germany deported some 50,000 people, mainly Romanis, to Kosovo. They were asylum seekers who fled the country during the Kosovo War. The people were deported after living more than 10 years in Germany. The deportations were highly controversial: many were children and obtained education in Germany, spoke German as their primary language and considered themselves to be Germans. Three victims of the Hanau shootings were Romanis.

Hungary
On 23 February 2009, a Romani man and his five-year-old son were shot dead in Tatárszentgyörgy village southeast of Budapest as they were fleeing their burning house which was set alight by a petrol bomb. The dead man's two other children suffered serious burns. Suspects were arrested and were on trial as of 2011.

In 2012, Viktória Mohácsi, 2004–2009 Hungarian Member of European Parliament of Romani ethnicity, asked for asylum in Canada after previously requesting police protection at home from serious threats she was receiving from hate groups.

Italy

In 2007 and 2008, following the brutal rape and subsequent murder of a woman in Rome at the hands of a young man from a local Romani encampment, the Italian government started a crackdown on illegal Roma and Sinti campsites in the country.

In May 2008, Romani camps in Naples were attacked and set on fire by local residents. In July 2008, a high court in Italy overthrew the conviction of defendants who had publicly demanded the expulsion of Romanis from Verona in 2001 and reportedly ruled that "it is acceptable to discriminate against Roma on the grounds that they are thieves". One of those freed was Flavio Tosi, Verona's mayor and an official of the anti-immigrant Lega Nord. The decision came during a "nationwide clampdown" on Romanis by Italian prime minister Silvio Berlusconi. The previous week, Berlusconi's interior minister Roberto Maroni had declared that all Romanis in Italy, including children, would be fingerprinted.

In 2011, the development of a National Inclusion Strategy for Rom, Sinti and Caminanti  under the supervision of European Commission has defined the presence of Romani camps as an unacceptable condition.
As already underlined by many international organizations, the prevalent positioning of the RSC communities in the c.d "nomad camps" fuels segregation and hinders every process of social integration / inclusion; but even where other more stable housing modalities have been found, forms of ghettoization and self-segregation are found, which hinder the process of integration / social inclusion.

Romania

Roma make up 3.3% of population in Romania. Prejudice against Romanis is common amongst the Romanians, who characterize them as thieves, dirty, and lazy. A 2000 EU report about Romani said that in Romania... the continued high levels of discrimination are a serious concern...and progress has been limited to programmes aimed at improving access to education. A survey of the Pro Democrația association in Romania revealed that 94% of the questioned persons believe that the Romanian citizenship should be revoked to the ethnic Romani who commit crimes abroad.

In 2009-2010, a media campaign followed by a parliamentarian initiative asked the Romanian Parliament to accept a proposal to change back the official name of country's Roma (adopted in 2000) to Țigan, the traditional and colloquial Romanian name for Romani, in order to avoid the possible confusion among the international community between the words Roma, which refers to the Romani ethnic minority, and Romania. The Romanian government supported the move on the grounds that many countries in the European Union use a variation of the word Țigan to refer to their Roma populations. The Romanian upper house, the Senate, rejected the proposal.

Several anti-Romani riots occurred in recent decades, notable of which being the 1993 Hădăreni riots, in which a mob of Romanians and Hungarians, in response to the killing of a Romanian by a Romani person, burnt down 13 houses belonging to Roma, lynched three Romani people and forced 130 people to flee the village.

In Baia Mare, Mayor Cătălin Cherecheș announced the building of a 3 metre high, 100 metre long concrete wall to divide the buildings in which the Roma community lives from the rest of the city and bring "order and discipline" into the area.

The manele, their modern music style, was prohibited in some cities of Romania in public transport and taxis, that action being justified by bus and taxi companies as being for passengers' comfort and a neutral ambience, acceptable for all passengers. However, those actions had been characterised by Speranta Radulescu, a professor of ethno-musicology at the Bucharest Conservatory, as "a defect of Romanian society". There were also a few criticisms of Professor Dr. Ioan Bradu Iamandescu's experimental study, which linked the listening of "manele" to an increased level of aggressiveness and low self-control and suggested a correlation between preference for that music style and low cognitive skills.

Sweden
Roma are one of the five official national minorities in Sweden.

In 1922, the first proposal on compulsory sterilisation in Sweden was made. Beginning in 1934, compulsory sterilisation of the "mentally retarded" was legally practiced by the Swedish state. Sterilisations were mostly conducted on disabled people, but also minority groups, such as the Roma. 30,000 people were sterilised against their will. It is not known exactly how many Roma people were sterilised, but it is estimated to be atleast 400-500 people. The policy was based on "racial science" supported by the State Institute for Racial Biology in Uppsala. In 1937, a "maternal care" policy was introduced for people of Roma heritage. It was used to convince Roma mothers to get sterilised. An excerpt from a childcare inspector's application of sterilisation on a woman in the mid 1940s: "The applicant - including the man - are of Romani heritage and still live a wandering life. […] It can not be seen as desirable that additional children are brought into this home. […] Maternal care for the last born child has been granted only on condition that the sterilisation operation is undertaken." The law on compulsory sterilisation was abolished in 1976.

In 2013, it was revealed that the Skåne Police held an illegal registry of over 4,000 Roma people, including children. It included many Roma people who had no criminal record. The registry was located in a folder in the Skåne Police's database, marked "itinerants". It was established by the Police in Lund, but was also sought after by other criminal agencies in other cities. 

In a survey commissioned by the Equality Ombudsman in 2002/2003, Roma described the discrimination they experience in their daily lives. 90 percent stated that they perceive Sweden to a certain or high degree as a racist country. The same amount agreed to a certain or high degree to the statement that the country has an attitude view towards Roma. 25 percent neither feel a part of the Swedish population nor feel accepted in the Swedish society. And 60 percent said that they have been called derogatory or discriminatory terms related to their ethnic background at least once in the last two years.

Slovakia

According to the last census from 2011, Roma make up 2.0% of the population in Slovakia.

Three Slovakian Romani women have come before the European Court of Human Rights on grounds of having been sterilised without their consent in Slovakian hospitals. The sterilisations were performed by tubal ligation after the women gave birth by Caesarean section. The court awarded two of the women costs and damages while the third case was dismissed because of the woman's death. A report by the Center for Reproductive Rights and the Centre for Civil and Human Rights has compiled more than 100 cases of Roma women in Slovakia who have been sterilised without their informed consent.

Roma are the victims of ethnically driven violence and crime in Slovakia. According to monitoring and reports provided by the European Roma Rights Center (ERRC) in 2013, racist violence, evictions, threats, and more subtle forms of discrimination have increased over the past two years in Slovakia. The ERRC considers the situation in Slovakia to be one of the worst in Europe, as of 2013.

Roma people suffer serious discrimination in Slovakia. Roma children are segregated in school and do not receive the level of education as other Slovakian children. Some are sent to schools for children with mild mental disabilities. As a result, their attainment level is far below average. Amnesty International’s report "Unfulfilled promises: Failing to end segregation of Roma pupils in Slovakia" describes the failure of the Slovak authorities to end the discrimination of Roma children on the grounds of their ethnicity in education. According to a 2012 United Nations Development Programme survey, around 43 per cent of Roma in mainstream schools attended ethnically segregated classes.

The 2019 Pew Research poll found that 76% of Slovaks held unfavorable views of Roma.

Non-EU countries

Canada
When Romani refugees were allowed into Canada in 1997, a protest was staged by 25 people, including neo-Nazis, in front of the motel where the refugees were staying. The protesters held signs that included, "Honk if you hate Gypsies", "Canada is not a Trash Can", and "G.S.T. – Gypsies Suck Tax". (The last is a reference to Canada's unpopular Goods and Services Tax, also known as GST.) The protesters were charged with promoting hatred, and the case, called R. v. Krymowski, reached the Supreme Court of Canada in 2005.

On 5 September 2012, prominent Canadian conservative commentator Ezra Levant broadcast a commentary "The Jew vs. the Gypsies" on J-Source in which he accused the Romani people of being a group of criminals: "These are gypsies, a culture synonymous with swindlers. The phrase gypsy and cheater have been so interchangeable historically that the word has entered the English language as a verb: he gypped me. Well the gypsies have gypped us. Too many have come here as false refugees. And they come here to gyp us again and rob us blind as they have done in Europe for centuries.… They’re gypsies. And one of the central characteristics of that culture is that their chief economy is theft and begging."

Kosovo
From the end of the Kosovo War in June 1999, about 80% of Kosovo's Romanis were expelled, amounting to approximately 100,000 expellees. For the 1999–2006 period, the European Roma Rights Centre documented numerous crimes perpetrated by Kosovo's ethnic Albanians with the purpose to purge the region of its Romani population along with other non-Albanian ethnic communities. These crimes included murder, abduction and illegal detention, torture, rape, arson, confiscation of houses and other property and forced labour. Whole Romani settlements were burned to the ground by Albanians. Romanis remaining in Kosovo are reported to be systematically denied fundamental human rights. They "live in a state of pervasive fear" and are routinely intimidated, verbally harassed and periodically attacked on racist grounds by Albanians. The Romani community of Kosovo is regarded to be, for the most part, annihilated.

At UN internally displaced persons' camps in Kosovska Mitrovica for Romanis, the refugees were exposed to lead poisoning.

Norway
In Norway, Romani, in common with other marginalised groups, were sterilised by the state, a practice which continued until 1977. In the period 1934-1977 a total of 125 sterilisations were performed on Romanis in Norway, accounting for 0.00288% of the total number of documented sterilisations.

Anti-Romanyism in Norway flared up in July 2012, when roughly 200 Romani people settled outside Sofienberg church in Oslo and were later relocated to a building site at Årvoll, in northern Oslo. The group was subjected to hate crimes in the form of stone throwing and fireworks being aimed at and fired into their camp. They, and Norwegians trying to assist them in their situation, also received death threats. Siv Jensen, the leader of the right-wing Progress Party, also advocated the expulsion of the Romani people resident in Oslo.

Switzerland
A Swiss right-wing magazine, Weltwoche, published a photograph of a gun-wielding Roma child on its cover in 2012, with the title "The Roma are coming: Plundering in Switzerland". They claimed in a series of articles of a growing trend in the country of "criminal tourism for which eastern European Roma clans are responsible", with professional gangs specializing in burglary, thefts, organized begging and street prostitution. The magazine immediately came under criticism for its links to the right-wing populist People's Party (SVP), as being deliberately provocative and encouraged racist stereotyping by linking ethnic origin and criminality. Switzerland's Federal Commission against Racism is considering legal action after complaints in Switzerland, Austria and Germany that the cover breached antiracism laws.

The Berlin newspaper Tagesspiegel investigated the origins of the photograph taken in the slums of Gjakova, Kosovo, where Roma communities were displaced during the Kosovo War to hovels built on a toxic landfill. The Italian photographer, Livio Mancini, denounced the abuse of his photograph, which was originally taken to demonstrate the plight of Roma families in Europe.

United Kingdom
According to the LGBT rights organisation and charity Stonewall, anti-Romanyism exists in the UK, with a distinction made between Romani people and Irish Travellers (both of whom are commonly known by the exonym "gypsies" in the UK), and the so-called "travellers [and] modern Gypsies". In 2008, the British media reported that Roma & Travellers experience a higher degree of discrimination than any other ethnic group in the UK, including asylum-seekers. A Mori poll showed that a third of respondents admitted to being prejudiced against Roma & Travellers.

Thousands of retrospective planning permissions are granted in Britain in cases involving non-Romani applicants each year, and statistics showed that 90% of planning applications by Romanis and Irish Travellers are initially refused by local councils compared with a national average of 20% for other applicants.
Some travellers have argued that the root of the problem was that many traditional stopping places had been barricaded off and that legislation passed by the previous Conservative governments had effectively criminalised their community. For example, some travellers have claimed that removing local authorities' responsibility to provide sites for travellers leaves them with no option but to purchase unregistered new sites themselves.

In August 2012, the Slovakian television network TV JOJ ran a story about instances of Romani immigrant families from Slovakia or the Czech Republic, whose children were forcibly taken away by government social workers. One Romani mother alleged that three social workers, accompanied by six police officers "broke into" their apartment, handcuffed her husband and took their three children away. These accounts sparked a protest by Romani emigrants in front of courthouses where such cases are decided, while government officials refused to comment on the allegations. According to protestors, Romani parents take good care of their children and live "orderly lives". One of the relatives of a mother who made such allegations stated that "they (the parents) are good people". Another mother alleged that she was allowed visitation with her newborn child only in an empty room; as there was no furniture, she was forced to change her baby's nappies on the floor. She claimed that this led social workers to write in their assessments of her that she was "abusing the child". The mother also claimed that if she refused to change her nappies this would lead to the same conclusion as well. In September 2012, the Slovakian government announced their intention to hold talks with British social workers over the decision to remove two Slovakian-born children from their parents and put them up for adoption. Several Slovak media outlets raised concerns over the ruling, which was described by the Wall Street Journal as "a thorny issue" between the British and Slovak governments. A crowd of 200 Slovakians protested in front of the British Embassy in Bratislava. The Slovak government threatened to take the British government to the European Court of Human Rights (ECHR) over the issue, reportedly being "disturbed" by allegations from Slovakian-born parents in the UK. The Slovak Ministry of Justice posted a declaration on their website highly critical of the actions taken by the British government and stated that if further rulings against Slovakian parents continue, they were prepared to submit an appeal to the ECHR over the issue. MP John Hemming spearheaded efforts in the UK, in cooperation with the Slovak ambassador, to oppose the ruling and reunite the children with their families.

England
In 2002 Conservative Party politician, and MP for Bracknell Andrew MacKay stated in a House of Commons debate on unauthorised encampments of Roma and other Travelling groups in the UK, "They [Roma and Travellers] are scum, and I use the word advisedly. People who do what these people have done do not deserve the same human rights as my decent constituents going about their ordinary lives".

In 2005, Doncaster Borough Council discussed in chamber a Review of Gypsy and Traveller Needs and concluded that "Gypsies" and Irish Travellers are among the most vulnerable and marginalised ethnic minority groups in Britain.

A Roma and Traveller support centre in Leeds, West Yorkshire, was vandalised in April 2011 in what the police suspect was a hate crime. The fire caused substantial damage to a centre that is used as a base for the support and education of Roma and travellers in the community.

Scotland
The Equal Opportunities Committee of the Scottish parliament in 2001 and in 2009 confirmed that widespread marginalisation and discrimination persists in Scottish society against Roma and traveller groups. A 2009 survey conducted by the Scottish Government also concludes that Scottish Roma and travellers had been largely ignored in official policies. A similar survey in 2006 found discriminatory attitudes in Scotland towards Roma and travellers, and showed 37 percent of those questioned would be unhappy if a relative married a Roma person or traveller while 48 percent found it unacceptable if a member of the Roma or traveller minorities became primary school teachers.

A report by the University of the West of Scotland found that both Scottish and UK governments had failed to safeguard the rights of the Roma as a recognized ethnic group and did not raise awareness of Roma rights within the UK. Additionally, an Amnesty International report published in 2012 stated that Traveller groups in Scotland routinely suffer widespread discrimination in society, as well as a disproportionate level of scrutiny in the media. Over a four-month period as a sample 48 per cent of articles showed Roma & Travellers in a negative light, while 25–28 per cent of articles were favourable, or of a neutral viewpoint. Amnesty recommended journalists adhere to ethical codes of conduct when reporting on Roma & Traveller populations in Scotland, as they face fundamental human rights concerns, particularly with regard to health, education, housing, family life and culture.

To tackle the widespread prejudices and needs of Roma/Traveller minorities, in 2011, the Scottish Government set up a working party to consider how best to improve community relations between Roma/Travellers and Scottish society. Including young Roma/Travellers to engage in an on-line positive messages campaign, contain factually correct information on their communities.

Wales
In 2007, a study by the newly formed Equality and Human Rights Commission found that negative attitudes and prejudice persist against Roma/Traveller communities in Wales. Results showed that 38 percent of those questioned would not accept a long-term relationship with, or would be unhappy if a close relative married or formed a relationship with, a Roma or other Traveller. Furthermore, only 37 percent found it acceptable if a member of the Roma or other Traveller minorities became primary school teachers, the lowest score of any group. An advertising campaign to tackle prejudice in Wales was launched by the Equality and Human Rights Commission (EHRC) in 2008.

Northern Ireland
In June 2009, having had their windows broken and deaths threats made against them, twenty Romanian Romani families were forced from their homes in Lisburn Road, Belfast, in Northern Ireland. Up to 115 people, including women and children, were forced to seek refuge in a local church hall after being attacked. They were later moved by the authorities to a safer location. An anti-racist rally in the city on 15 June to support Romani rights was attacked by youths chanting neo-Nazi slogans. The attacks were condemned by Amnesty International and political leaders from both the Unionist and Nationalist traditions in Northern Ireland.

Following the arrest of three local youths in relation to the attacks, the church where the Romanis had been given shelter was badly vandalised. Using 'emergency funds', Northern Ireland authorities assisted most of the victims to return to Romania.

United States

Elsie Paroubek Affair (1911)
In Chicago in 1911, the highly-publicised disappearance of the five-year old Elsie Paroubek was immediately blamed on "Gypsy child kidnappers". The public was alerted to reports that "Gypsies were seen with a little girl" and many such reports came in. Police raided a "Gypsy" encampment near 18th and South Halstead in Chicago itself and they later expanded the searches and raids to encampments throughout the state of Illinois, to locations as widespread as Round Lake, McHenry, Volo and Cherry Valley - but they found no trace of the missing girl. The police attributed her capture to "the natural love of the wandering people for blue-eyed, yellow-haired children". Lillian Wulff, age 11 - who had actually been kidnapped by some Romanis four years earlier - came forward to offer his assistance, leading the police to conduct further fruitless raids, as well as convincing them to detain the supposed "King of the Gypsies", Elijah George - who, however,"failed to give them the desired information", and was released. Elijah George was detained in Argyle, Wisconsin, and this served to spread the anti-Romani hysteria outside Illinois.

Present situation
At the present time, because the Roma population in the United States has quickly assimilated and Roma people are not often portrayed in US popular culture, the term "Gypsy" is typically associated with a trade or lifestyle instead of being associated with the Romani ethnic group. Additionally, some small businesses, particularly those in the fortune-telling and psychic reading industry, use the term "Gypsy" to describe themselves or their enterprises, even though they have no ties to the Roma people.

While some scholars argue that appropriation of the Roma identity in the United States is based on misconceptions and ignorance rather than anti-Romanyism, Romani advocacy groups decry the practice.

Environmental struggles

Environmental issues which were caused by Cold War-era industrial development have disproportionately impacted the Roma, particularly those Roma who live in Eastern Europe. Most often, the traditional nomadic lifestyle of the Roma causes them to settle on the outskirts of towns and cities, where amenities, employment and educational opportunities are often inaccessible. As of 1993, Hungary has been identified as one country where this issue exists: "While the economic restructuring of a command economy into a western style market economy created hardships for most Hungarians, with the national unemployment rate heading toward 14 percent and per capita real income falling, the burdens which are imposed on Romanis are disproportionately great."

Panel buildings (panelák) in the Chanov ghetto near Most, Czech Republic were built in the 1970s for a high-income clientele, the authorities introduced a model plan, whereby Roma were relocated to these buildings, from poorer areas, to live among Czech neighbors. However, with the rising proportion of Roma moving in, the Czech clients gradually moved out in a kind of white flight, eventually leaving a district in which the vast majority of residents were Roma. A poll in 2007 marked the district as the worst place in the Ústí nad Labem Region. Buildings were eventually stripped of any valuable materials and torn down. The removal of materials was blamed on the Roma who had last inhabited the building. Despite a total rental debt in excess of €3.5 million, all of the tenants in the remaining buildings continue to be provided with water and electricity, unlike the situation in many other European countries.
 When newly built in the 1980s, some flats in this settlement were assigned to Roma who had relocated from poverty-stricken locations in a government effort to integrate the Roma population. Other flats were assigned to families of military and law-enforcement personnel. However, the military and police families gradually moved out of the residences and the living conditions for the Roma population deteriorated. Ongoing failures to pay bills led to the disconnection of the water supply and an emergency plan was eventually created to provide running water for two hours per day to mitigate against the bill payment issue. Similarly to Chanov, some of these buildings were stripped of their materials and were eventually torn down; again, the Roma residents were identified as the culprits who were to blame for the theft of the materials.

The various legal hindrances to their traditional nomadic lifestyle have forced many travelling Roma to move into unsafe areas, such as ex-industrial areas, former landfills or other waste areas where pollutants have affected rivers, streams or groundwater. Consequently, Roma are often unable to access clean water or sanitation facilities, rendering the Roma people more vulnerable to health problems, such as diseases. Based in Belgium, the Health & Environment Alliance has included a statement with regard to the Roma on one of its pamphlets: "Denied environmental benefits such as water, sewage treatment facilities, sanitation and access to natural resources, and suffer from exposure to environmental hazards due to their proximity to hazardous waste sites, incinerators, factories, and other sources of pollution." Since the fall of communism and the privatisation of the formerly state owned water-supply companies in many areas of central and eastern Europe, the provision of decent running water to illegal buildings which are often occupied by Roma became a particularly sensitive issue, because the new international owners of the water-supply companies are unwilling to make contracts with the Roma population and as a result, "water-borne diseases, such as diarrhoea and dysentery" became "an almost constant feature of daily life, especially for children".

In popular culture
 In the 2006 mockumentary Borat, Sacha Baron Cohen's character explains that his home town has "a tall fence for keeping out Gypsies and Jews"; the scene featuring this town was filmed in Glod, a Roma village in central Romania. He makes many more anti-Romani statements throughout the film.
 Many instances of Anti-Romanyism are described in Kristian Novak's 2016 novel Ziganin but the most beautiful.

See also
 History of the Romani people
 Itinerant groups in Europe
 Racism in Europe
 Romani diaspora

Notes

References

External links 
 Human Rights First Report on Violence Against Roma
 Council of Europe webpage on anti-Romanyism
 European Centre for Antiziganism Research
 OSCE/ODIHR portal on Roma and Sinti issues
 European Roma Rights Centre

Anti-national sentiment
 
Genocides
Romani
Racism in the United Kingdom
Racism in Europe
Racism